Dane Lloyd  (born February 16, 1991) is a Canadian politician who was elected to the House of Commons of Canada in a by-election on October 23, 2017, following the resignation of Rona Ambrose. Lloyd represents the constituency of Sturgeon River—Parkland as a member of the Conservative Party of Canada. Lloyd continues to serve as a Canadian Army reservist in the Governor General's Foot Guards located in Ottawa. As of 2017 he held a commission as an infantry officer with the rank of lieutenant.

Early life
Lloyd was born in St. Albert, Alberta, and raised in Spruce Grove, Alberta. He attended and graduated from Edmonton Christian High School in 2009.  In 2014, he graduated from Trinity Western University with a Bachelor of Arts in history and political science. While completing his undergraduate studies, Lloyd was elected vice president of Academic Affairs for the Trinity Western University Student Association.  He attended the Laurentian Leadership Centre in Ottawa, and served as President of the Trinity Western Model United Nations Society.

Career
Lloyd served as a special assistant to then Minister of International Trade (the Honourable Ed Fast) and then as an aide to Jason Kenney when he was a federal cabinet minister and later as parliamentary advisor to St. Albert—Edmonton MP Michael Cooper.

In Canada's 43rd Parliament
Since being elected, Lloyd has served on several Parliamentary Committees including the Standing Committee on Industry, Science and Technology; the Special Committee on the COVID-19 pandemic; and the Standing Committee on Veterans Affairs.

On September 8, 2020 Conservative leader Erin O'Toole appointed Lloyd as Shadow Minister for Digital Government.

McCann's Law
St. Albert residents Lyle and Marie McCann went missing in July 2010 on a road trip from their home town to Chilliwack, British Columbia. Their charred motor home was discovered a few days later, resulting in a search that led to the arrest (and subsequent conviction) of Travis Vader for their murder. While Vader was still unwilling to assist authorities in locating the McCanns’ remains he will be eligible for parole in 2021. This was the catalyst for Lloyd's commitment, in the 2017 Sturgeon River-Parkland Conservative Nomination, to introduce a Private Member's Bill that would help families recover the remains of their loved ones. The McCann's oldest son, Bret McCann, worked with Lloyd in drafting of the bill after he was elected.

In March 2019, Lloyd introduced Private Member's Bill C-437, An Act to amend the Criminal Code, the Corrections and Conditional Release Act and the Prisons and Reformatories Act, also known as McCanns’ Law. If passed, willingness to assist authorities to locate the remains of the victim(s) would be a consideration for parole eligibility for someone convicted in the death of a person. According to Lloyd "the hope is not to necessarily punish people more, but to give them (an) incentive to cooperate, to give relevant information on the location of the bodies and then enable the families to have the closure of a funeral."

In Canada's 44th Parliament
Lloyd was re-elected to the 44th Canadian Parliament. As of 2022 he served only on the Standing Committee on Public Safety and National Security (SECU).

On 25 February 2022 new interim leader Candice Bergen named Lloyd to shadow the Minister of Emergency Preparedness.

Emergencies Act investigation
In the wake of the 2022 Freedom Convoy protest and crackdown, the SECU committee held a number of investigatory meetings. Lloyd attracted attention when he "grilled" interim Ottawa police chief Steve Bell over the conduct of his force during the event. Lloyd was persistent on the question "about whether loaded firearms were found in protesters' vehicles", to which Bell answered "there have been no charges laid to date in relation to weapons at the occupation site." Lloyd then accused a Toronto Star journalist, Justin Ling, and Minister of Crown–Indigenous Relations Marc Miller of spreading misinformation.

On 13 April 2022 Lloyd returned to this subject when pressed by the Western Standard:

On 19 May 2022 Lloyd asked Minister for Public Safety Marco Mendicino about the need for the invocation of the Emergencies Act. Mendicino said he "stands by previous statements that the federal government invoked the Emergencies Act on the recommendation of law enforcement officials." The "previous statements" were in witness testimony that Mendicino made at a committee hearing in April, to wit that the government "invoked the act because it was the advice of non-partisan professional law enforcement that the existing authorities were ineffective at the time to restore public safety."

Controversies

Support for Rebel News
In 2014 Lloyd shared a link on Facebook to a fundraising campaign by The Rebel to fight "anti-Christian bigots on Nanaimo city council."

Canadian NRA
In 2009, at the age of 18 he announced his intention on Facebook to create a National Rifle Association of Canada. However, during his October 2017 by-election campaign, Lloyd stated that his views had changed since 2009 and he now favours a "commitment to cost-effective gun control programs designed to keep guns out of the hands of criminals while respecting the rights of law-abiding Canadians to own and use firearms responsibly."

Feminazis
Lloyd used the term 'feminazis' while commenting on a Facebook post regarding Guelph University's 2009 decision to close its women studies program—something he since regrets and said in October 2017 "is not a term he would use today".

Support for General Lee
In 2015 he commented on a Facebook post referencing an article from the Russia Today website opposing the removal of a 1945 memorial to Confederate General Robert E. Lee from a park in Baltimore, stating that despite being on the wrong side of the Civil War "his actions at the end of the war did much to heal and unite a deeply divided nation."

Personal life
Lloyd is married to Raechel. He attended a Baptist Church in St. Albert, Alberta, and worships regularly with the Anglican Network in Canada denomination.

Electoral record

References

External links

1991 births
Living people
Conservative Party of Canada MPs
Members of the House of Commons of Canada from Alberta
People from St. Albert, Alberta
Trinity Western University alumni
21st-century Canadian politicians
21st-century Canadian military personnel